Raver or ravers may refer to:

Places
 Raver, Maharashtra, a city in India
 Raver (Vidhan Sabha constituency)
 Raver (Lok Sabha constituency)

People
 Kim Raver (born 1969), American actress
 Lorna Raver (born 1943), American actress

Comics
 Raver (comic), a 1993 comic book mini-series written by Walter Koenig and published by Malibu Comics
The Raver, superhero protagonist of the comic
 Ravers, fictional spirits in the 1970s–1980s fantasy novel series "The Chronicles of Thomas Covenant, the Unbeliever" by Stephen R. Donaldson
 The Ravers, the name of a team of DC Comics superheroes in a short-lived 1990s comic book series Superboy and the Ravers

Music
 Raver, someone who attends a rave
 "The Raver", a music gossip column published in the 1960s and 1970s in the consumer music weekly Melody Maker and now as an online column
 "Ravers", a song by Quiet Riot from their 1977 self-titled album
 The Ravers, the original name of 1970s new wave band The Nails

See also
Rave (disambiguation)
 The Rave-Ups
Raven (disambiguation)